Live from Camp X-Ray is the seventh studio album by American punk rock band Rocket from the Crypt, released in 2002 by Vagrant Records. It was the band's final studio album, as they broke up on Halloween 2005. Contrary to the album's title, it is not a "live" album but rather a studio recording.

Although the album received generally positive reviews, many consumers were confused by its title and assumed it to be a live album, which in fact it was not. The title was actually a reference to Camp X-Ray, the temporary detention facility located at the U.S. Naval Base in Guantanamo Bay, Cuba. Some fans and critics expressed their disappointment at the album's length, stating that a playing time of 26 minutes was not sufficient for a full-length album and that they had expected more creative output from the band. By this time, however, the band's members had drifted heavily into other projects (most notably singer/guitarist John Reis, who was simultaneously playing in Hot Snakes and Sultans and running his record label Swami Records) and were not as creatively dedicated to Rocket as they had been in the past. Cryptic liner notes written by Long Gone John seemed to indicate that the album was a "last gasp" of a band in turmoil and that it might be their final album.

Touring in support of Live from Camp X-Ray was sparse due to the band members' commitments to other projects, and they would perform infrequently over the next few years. In August 2005, after breaking up Hot Snakes, Reis announced that Rocket from the Crypt would play their final performance on Halloween of that year. This confirmed suspicions that Live from Camp X-Ray was the band's final studio album, though posthumous releases of material recorded before their breakup have since been released.

"Bring Us Bullets" is notable for being featured in the film Crank.

Track listing
"I'm Not Invisible"
"Get Down"
"I Can't Feel My Head"
"Can You Hear It?"
"I Wanna Know What I Wanna Know"
"Bring Us Bullets"
"Bucket of Piss"
"Dumb Blind and Horny"
"Outsider"
"Too Many Balls"

Personnel
Speedo (John Reis) – guitar, lead vocals
ND (Andy Stamets) – guitar, backing vocals
Petey X (Pete Reichert) – bass, backing vocals
Apollo 9 (Paul O'Beirne) - saxophone, percussion, backing vocals
JC 2000 (Jason Crane) - trumpet, percussion, backing vocals
Ruby Mars (Mario Rubalcaba) – drums
Anne Zarkus, Wes Tudor, Jason Greenworld, Patricia McLurmick, Santa Peuraro, Kara Richardson, Brianna Lotes, and Evelyn Cooperman – strings on "Can You Hear It?" and "I Wanna Know What I Wanna Know"

Album information
Record label: Vagrant Records
Produced by John Reis
Recorded at Drag Racist studios in San Diego Summer 2002 by John Reis, Dave Gardner and Ben Moore
Mixed by Ben Moore at Big Fish Recorders with assistance by Jason Clark
Mastered by Eddy Schreyer
Artwork by Yannick Desfanleau and Chloe Lum
Additional layout and design by Joby J. Ford
Band photo by Ryan Joseph Shuaghnessy III
Liner notes by Long Gone John

References

2002 albums
Vagrant Records albums
Rocket from the Crypt albums